The 2020–21 LEB Oro season was the 25th season of the Spanish basketball second league. It started on 16 October 2020 with the first round of the regular season and ended on 20 June 2021 with the final.

It was the following season after the 2019–20 season was curtailed in response to the COVID-19 pandemic. Consequently, there were not relegations to LEB Plata and the league was expanded to 19 teams, record of the league, which was divided into two groups for the first time in its history. On August 27, 2020, FEB and acb agreed a support plan for the league and intended to alleviate the effects of COVID-19 pandemic, as well as to guarantee the broadcast of all the matches of the league. The total of these grants, therefore, amounted to one million euros, which were distributed evenly among the clubs registered in the league for the 2020–21 season. On March 1, 2021, the start of the second phase was postponed one week due to the impossibility of playing all the matches of the first phase before March 7 in response to the COVID-19 outbreak that emerged in ICG Força Lleida which affected eight team members.

Format changes
For this season, the league consisted of two group phases with two groups of 9 and 10 teams in each phase. At the end of the first phase, the top five teams of each group joined the promotion group and the rest of the teams joined the relegation group. In the second phase, the results of the teams that played in the first phase swept to the second phase avoiding to play four times with the same team. At the end of the second phase, the seven top teams of the promotion group and the top team of the relegation group qualified for the playoffs and the last four teams of the relegation group were relegated to LEB Plata. For the playoffs, all rounds were played in a best-of-three series to decide the only promotion to Liga ACB.

Teams

Promotion and relegation (pre-season)
A total of 19 teams contested the league, including 16 sides from the 2019–20 season and three promoted from the 2019–20 LEB Plata. On July 21, 2020, Marín Ence PeixeGalego did not register in the league.

Teams promoted from LEB Plata
Real Murcia
Bàsquet Girona
Tizona Universidad de Burgos

Venues and locations

Personnel and sponsorship

Managerial changes

First phase

Group A

League table

Positions by round
The table lists the positions of teams after completion of each round. In order to preserve chronological evolvements, any postponed matches are not included in the round at which they are originally scheduled, but added to the full round they are played immediately afterwards.

Results

Group B

League table

Positions by round
The table lists the positions of teams after completion of each round. In order to preserve chronological evolvements, any postponed matches are not included in the round at which they are originally scheduled, but added to the full round they are played immediately afterwards.

Results

Second phase

Promotion group

League table

Positions by round
The table lists the positions of teams after completion of each round. In order to preserve chronological evolvements, any postponed matches are not included in the round at which they are originally scheduled, but added to the full round they are played immediately afterwards.

Results

Relegation group

League table

Positions by round
The table lists the positions of teams after completion of each round. In order to preserve chronological evolvements, any postponed matches are not included in the round at which they are originally scheduled, but added to the full round they are played immediately afterwards.

Results

Playoffs

Source: FEB

Copa Princesa de Asturias
The Copa Princesa de Asturias was played on 22 January 2021, by the top team of each group after the end of the first half of the season (round 9 of first phase).

Teams qualified

Game

Final standings

Awards 
All official awards of the 2020–21 LEB Oro season.

Copa Princesa de Asturias MVP

Source:

Player of the round

First phase

Second phase

Quarter-finals

Semi-finals

Final

References

External links
 Official website 

LEB
LEB Oro seasons
Second level Spanish basketball league seasons
2020–21 in European second tier basketball leagues